George Michael ("Mike") Reed is an American computer scientist. He has contributed to theoretical computer science in general and CSP in particular.

Mike Reed has a doctorate in pure mathematics from Auburn University, United States, and a doctorate in computation from Oxford University, England. He has an interest in mathematical topology.

Reed was a Senior Research Associate at NASA Goddard Space Flight Center. From 1986 to 2005, he was at the Oxford University Computing Laboratory (now the Oxford University Department of Computer Science) in England where he was also a Fellow in Computation of St Edmund Hall, Oxford (1986–2005). In 2005, he became Director of UNU/IIST, Macau, part of the United Nations University.

References

External links
 
 

Year of birth missing (living people)
Living people
Auburn University alumni
Alumni of the University of Oxford
Members of the Department of Computer Science, University of Oxford
Fellows of St Edmund Hall, Oxford
Academic staff of United Nations University
American computer scientists
Formal methods people
Topologists
20th-century American mathematicians
21st-century American mathematicians